This is a list of Singaporeans, people who are identified with Singapore through residential, legal, historical, or cultural means, sorted by surnames/family names.

Please do not add entries that have no articles written about them.